Heartland Cowboy: Cowboy Songs, Vol. 5 is the twenty-seventh album by American singer-songwriter Michael Martin Murphey, his fifth album of cowboy songs. The album includes the hit song "Long and Lonesome Ride to Dalhart", which won the 2006 Wrangler Award for Outstanding Original Western Composition. The album was inspired by Murphey's life on his ranch and his real experiences working as an activist and artist in American Ranching and Farming.

Track listing
 "Free Rein (Jessica's Song)" (Murphey) – 3:22
 "Close to the Land" (Murphey, Quist) – 4:33
 "Wheel Comes Around (Morgan's Song)" (Murphey, Riness) – 4:36
 "Dry Lightning" (Springsteen) – 5:17
 "Out of Line (Karen's Song)" (Murphey) – 4:43
 "Long and Lonesome Ride to Dalhart" (Murphey) – 3:57
 "Storm Over the Rangeland (The Ballad of Kit Laney)" (Murphey) – 4:15
 "Ride out the Storm" (Murphey) – 5:17
 "Bluebonnets" (Murphey) – 4:09
 "My Country Under God (Sarah's Song)" (Murphey) – 3:39
 "America's Heartland" (Reprise) / "Simple Gifts" – 1:27

Personnel
 Michael Martin Murphey – vocals, acoustic guitar, banjo
 Pat Flynn – mando-guitar, 12-string acoustic guitar
 Ryan Murphey – slide guitar, acoustic guitar
 Chris Leuzinger – electric guitar
 Tim Laure – keyboards, Hammond organ, piano
 Jim Hoke – accordion
 David Davidson – fiddle
 Larry Franklin – fiddle
 Laura Wood – violin
 Ian Davidson – English horn
 Bobby Blazier – drums, percussion
 Ron Hemby – background vocals
 Sonya Isaacs – background vocals
 Kristen Wilkenson – orchestral arrangements

References

External links
 Michael Martin Murphey's Official Website

2006 albums
Michael Martin Murphey albums
Sequel albums